The 2015 Real Monarchs SLC season is the club's first season of existence. Real Monarchs SLC competes in the United Soccer League, the third tier of the American soccer pyramid. The season began on March 22 and will conclude on September 12.

Background

The Monarchs entered 2015 as one of 13 new clubs in the USL. The club was created as the USL affiliate for Real Salt Lake of Major League Soccer.

Players

As of May 8, 2015

Competitions

Preseason

USL regular season

Results summary

Standings

U.S. Open Cup

References

American soccer clubs 2015 season
2015
2015 in sports in Utah
2015 USL season